Sur Sagar TV, also known as SSTV, is a Canadian Category B Punjabi language specialty channel with select programming in English. It is owned by Ravinder Singh Pannu and features a mix of programming, including movies, news, dramas and music.

The channel was authorized by the Canadian Radio-television and Telecommunications Commission in 2000.

Pannu also operates Sur Saagar Radio, a radio station available on cable and SCMO.  It is currently available through Shaw Direct and EastLink Cable.

From September 2013 to mid-2015, Sur Sagar TV had been available over the air via KVOS-TV's digital subchannel 12.3.

References

External links
 SSTV
 Sur Sagar Radio

Digital cable television networks in Canada
Punjabi-language television in Canada